Elsing is a village and civil parish in the English county of Norfolk.

History
Elsing's name is of Anglo-Saxon origin and derives from the Old English for the settlement of Elesa's people.

In the Domesday Book, Elsing is listed as a settlement of 20 households in the hundred of Eynesford. In 1086, the village was part of the East Anglian estates of William de Warenne.

Elsing Hall was built in the late-Fifteenth Century as a fortified manor house for the Hastings family of Gressenhall. The agricultural land surrounding the hall has yielded many Medieval artefacts including a pilgrim's badge, a French jeton and parts of a crossbow, with a good example of a Sixteenth Century priest hole inside. The hall was heavily restored in the mid-Nineteenth Century by Thomas Jeckyll.

Some sources suggest that Medieval Elsing had a large population with its own marketplace and guildhall.

Elsing Mill was first built in 1809 and operated as a paper mill until 1818. The mill subsequently reopened in 1854 as a grain mill and remained open until 1970. Today, the mill is a private residence.

Geography
In the 2011 Census, Elsing has a population of 244 residents living in 125 households.

Elsing falls within the constituency of Mid Norfolk and is represented at Parliament by George Freeman MP of the Conservative Party. For the purposes of local government, the parish falls within the district of Breckland.

St. Mary's Church

Elsing's parish church is dedicated to Saint Mary and was built in the Fourteenth Century, largely as a mausoleum for Sir Hugh Hastings, who is depicted in the stained-glass of St. Mary's alongside Saint George and King Edward III.

Amenities
The Mermaid Inn pub dates from the mid-Sixteenth Century and is now closed.

Notable Residents
 Bob Simpson (1944-2006)- BBC journalist

War Memorial
Elsing's war memorial takes the form of stone column topped with a Celtic cross with the names of the fallen inscribed on a small plinth below, located inside St. Mary's Churchyard. The memorial was unveiled in August 1921 by a party of local dignitaries led by Bertram Pollock, Bishop of Norwich and lists the following names for the First World War:
 Rgt-Sgt.Maj. Harry J. Mason (1872-1918), Royal Norfolk Regiment
 Sgt. Donald W. Kerrison (d.1918), 7th Battalion, Royal Irish Regiment
 Cpl. Charles Candy (d.1917), 50th Company, Machine Gun Corps
 L-Cpl. John W. Kendall (1893-1917), 8th Battalion, Border Regiment
 Pvt. Walter G. Isbell (1896-1917), 10th Battalion, Essex Regiment
 Pvt. S. William Rix (1898-1918), 2nd Battalion, Royal Fusiliers
 Pvt. John C. Dack (d.1916), 1st Battalion, Royal Norfolk Regiment
 Pvt. Benjamin R. Wire (1894-1916), 1st Battalion, Royal Norfolk Regiment
 Pvt. Matthew E. Bowes (d.1918), 7th Battalion, Royal Norfolk Regiment
 Pvt. George Rix (1885-1916), 7th Battalion, Royal Norfolk Regiment
 Pvt. E. William Dack (d.1917), 7th Battalion, Northamptonshire Regiment
 Harry Lawrence

And, the following for the Second World War:
 Sgt. Keith S. Bushell (1919-1940), No. 206 Squadron RAF
 Pvt. Gordon R. Isbell (1920-1944), East Surrey Regiment

References

External links

Elsing Mill

Villages in Norfolk
Civil parishes in Norfolk
Breckland District